Sternitta magna is a moth of the family Erebidae first described by Michael Fibiger in 2011. It is found in India.

The wingspan is about 13.5 mm. The forewing ground colour is unicolorous grey with a slightly brownish tint, but dark grey at the base of the costa and in the upper medial area. The crosslines are brown, including the interveinal dots that indicate the terminal line. The hindwing ground colour is light grey and the abdomen is light grey.

References

Micronoctuini
Taxa named by Michael Fibiger
Moths described in 2011